James McPhail Ritchie (10 July 1907 – 6 July 1942) was a Scottish international rugby union player, who died in World War II at Rawalpindi in British India (now Pakistan) of enteric fever.

He also played for Watsonians RFC.

See also
 List of Scottish rugby union players killed in World War II

Sources
 Bath, Richard (ed.) The Scotland Rugby Miscellany (Vision Sports Publishing Ltd, 2007 )
 Massie, Allan A Portrait of Scottish Rugby (Polygon, Edinburgh)

References

External links
 Player profile on scrum.com

1907 births
1942 deaths
Scottish rugby union players
Scotland international rugby union players
Watsonians RFC players
Indian Army personnel killed in World War II
Infectious disease deaths in Punjab, Pakistan
Deaths from typhoid fever
Punjab Regiment officers